Nong Bua Lam Phu is a town in Thailand, capital of Nong Bua Lamphu Province. It is on the central eastern border of the province, approximately 45 kilometers south-west of the city of Udon Thani and from there, accessed by route 210. The town lies 536 km north-north-east of Bangkok.

See also
 Mueang Nong Bua Lam Phu District, the capital district of Nong Bua Lam Phu Province

External links

Populated places in Nong Bua Lamphu province
Cities and towns in Thailand
Isan